Leonard Knight Elmhirst  (6 June 1893 – 16 April 1974) was a British philanthropist and agronomist who worked extensively in India. He co-founded with his wife, Dorothy, the Dartington Hall project in progressive education and rural reconstruction.

Biography
Leonard Elmhirst was born into a landed gentry family in Worsbrough (now part of Barnsley, Yorkshire), where the family seat is Houndhill. He was the second of nine siblings (eight boys and one girl). His elder brother, Captain William Elmhirst, was killed on 13 November 1916, aged 24, while serving with the 8th Battalion East Yorkshire Regiment during the Battle of the Somme, and the third son, Second Lieutenant Ernest Christopher Elmhirst, was killed on 7 August 1915, aged 20, while serving with the 8th Bn. Duke of Wellington's (West Riding Regiment) during the Gallipoli Campaign; both during World War I. The fourth son, Thomas became Air Marshal Sir Thomas Elmhirst (KBE, CB, AFC, DL, RAF).

In 1912 Leonard Elmhirst went up to Trinity College, Cambridge to study history and theology, intending to follow his father into the Church. In 1914, he was deemed unfit for military service and volunteered for overseas service in the YMCA. His experience of the problems of rural India was to fundamentally change the direction of his career. After one year's service in the army he was demobilised in 1919 and entered Cornell University in Ithaca, New York to study agriculture. Arriving almost penniless, he successfully completed a four-year degree course in two years.
In 1920 he was elected president of Cornell's Cosmopolitan Club, which was mostly for foreign students, and found that it had large debts and depended on the philanthropy of its alumni and others. Money-raising activities brought him in contact with Dorothy Straight, who was to become his wife.

In America he also met the 1913 Nobel Laureate for Literature, Rabindranath Tagore, and in November 1921 returned to India as Tagore's secretary. In 1922, in the village of Surul (of which Sriniketan is a part) adjacent to Santiniketan, West Bengal, he set up for Tagore an Institute of Rural Reconstruction. Between 1923 and 1925, Leonard travelled twice around the globe, lecturing and supporting Rabindranath Tagore's missions to Europe, Asia and South America.

The influence of Tagore, and the interests and money of his wife to be, led Elmhirst to undertake an experiment in rural reconstruction at Dartington Hall in Devon. It is said that Tagore had become familiar with Dartington during his travels in England and influenced Elmhirst in his selection of the estate, which was purchased in a series of transactions in 1925. Elmhirst also assisted in the re-acquisition of his ancient family seat, Houndhill, a couple of miles from his birthplace.

Works
In 1931, when the Dartington Hall experiment was established they set up a trust to manage its affairs so they could undertake other work worldwide. Leonard's work included:

 Work for Exeter University, Devon County Council and local organisations
 1929: launched the International Conference of Agricultural Economists
 1931: helped to found the policy think tank Political and Economic Planning
 1932: brought artificial insemination of cattle from Russia to Devon
 President of the Royal Forestry Society
 War-time public service during World War II including agricultural missions to the Middle East and India
 Irrigation and hydroelectricity in the Damodar Valley, India
 1954: Member, Indian Rural Education Committee

Personal life
Leonard married Dorothy Payne Whitney in September 1925. They had two children. He was the stepfather of racing driver and aviator Whitney Straight (1912–1979), actress Beatrice Straight (1914–2001) and writer and KGB spy Michael Whitney Straight (1916–2004). Their daughter Ruth married the environmentalist Maurice Ash. On the occasion of the 25th wedding anniversary of Leonard and Dorothy Elmhirst in 1950, Benjamin Britten composed Five Flower Songs, a cycle of part songs premiered in the open air at Dartington, conducted by Imogen Holst. After Dorothy died, Leonard married Susanna Isaacs-Elmhirst in 1973 in Worsborough, Yorkshire.

Honours

In 1946 he refused the offer of a barony from Prime Minister Clement Attlee.  In a letter to Attlee he replied that "My own work, however, as you know, has lain in the main among country people...in India, the USA and in Devonshire...acceptance would neither be easy for me to explain nor easy for my friends to comprehend". In 1972, he declined another honour from Ted Heath.

He received honorary doctorates from Freiburg (D.Pol.Sci.), Visva-Bharati (D.Litt.), the University of Durham (D.C.L.), the University of Oxford (D.C.L.), and the University of Exeter (D.C.L.). He was elected a Fellow of the Royal Society of Arts in 1926 and a fellow of the American Farm Economic Association in 1960.

He was elected Honorary President of the Devonshire Association in 1959.

References

Further reading

Michael Young, The Elmhirsts of Dartington, The Creation of a Utopian Community, Routledge & Kegan Paul, 1982

English philanthropists
English educational theorists
Alumni of Trinity College, Cambridge
Cornell University College of Agriculture and Life Sciences alumni
Military personnel from Yorkshire
British Army officers
British Army personnel of World War I
Whitney family
1893 births
1974 deaths
People associated with Santiniketan
People from Barnsley
20th-century British philanthropists